Ulises Francisco Espaillat Quiñones (February 9, 1823 – April 25, 1878) was a Dominican author and politician.  He served as president of the Dominican Republic from April 29, 1876 to October 5, 1876. Espaillat Province is named after him.

Early life 
Ulises Francisco Espaillat Quiñones was born on 9 February 1823 in Santiago, officially known from 1822 to 1844 as Saint-Yague, into a wealthy family of French, Canarian, Aragonese and Genovese descent; he was the only son of Pedro Ramón Espaillat Velilla (Santiago, 1796−idem, 1882) and María Petronila Quiñones Tavares (1804−1874). His father was the tenth and junior child of Francisco Espaillat y Virol —a Frenchman native to Masclat that settled in Santiago in 1758 in an epoch where one-third of the population was of French origin— and Petronila Velilla Sánchez —whose father was born in Aragon. He was described by his contemporaries as a tall, pale-complexioned, blue-eyed, dark blond-haired man.

In his early childhood and adolescence he received lessons in English, French, music, mathematics and other disciplines, within the limited possibilities of school education that the country lived under the Haitian occupation. He later received medical lessons from a paternal uncle, Dr. Santiago Espaillat (who later became President-elect in 1849). Ulises Espaillat established a pharmacy in the early 1840s.

In 1845, he married his first cousin, Eloísa Espaillat Rodríguez, the daughter of his uncle Juan José Espaillat Velilla.

Politics 
Espaillat served in many offices, including Senator, member of the House of Representatives, Customs Inspector of Puerto Plata, and member of the Provincial Deputation of Santiago. He opposed the 1861 Spanish colonial restoration, and as a result, he was exiled; he returned to his country in 1863. He served as Vice President in 1864.

With the support of Gregorio Luperón, Espaillat won the March 24, 1876 presidential election. Espaillat was a political and economic liberal who wished to broaden the personal freedoms of the Dominican people and improve the country's economy by taking from the producers of the society in order to pay for his ideas. However, he was forced to resign (on December 20, 1876) before he could set in motion any plan of action, due to rebellions in the south and east.

Legacy
Espaillat Province, as well as the Ulises Francisco Espaillat metro station in Santo Domingo are named after him.

Ancestry

Offspring 
President Espaillat has been identified as the most recent common ancestor for most of the Dominican oligarchy and aristocracy, since his offspring managed to establish bonds with the most prominent families from Santiago, who became later the richest families of the country.

Ulises Francisco Espaillat Velilla  his cousin Eloísa Espaillat Rodríguez (Santiago, 1818–ibid., 1919)
 Teófilo Espaillat Espaillat (Santiago, 1847–1866); never got married.
 Augusto Espaillat Espaillat (Santiago, 1849–1896)  Felicia Amalia Julia Julia (1859–1911)
 Enrique de Jesús Espaillat Julia (1877–1934)  Ana Idalia González Nouel (1878–1970)
 María Eloisa “Mayoya” Espaillat González (Santiago, 1899–ibidem, 1991)  José Ignacio Bermúdez Ramos
 Ana Idalia Bermúdez Espaillat (1924–1999)  her second-cousin once-removed Edmundo Enrique Batlle Viñas 
  Edmundo Batlle Bermúdez  Claudia Cabral Lluberes (b. 1964)
 Ana Amelia Batlle Cabral
  Laura Emilia Batlle Cabral
  Erasmo Bermúdez Espaillat (1929–1961)  his cousin Ana Luisa Bermúdez Castillo
 Felicia Altagracia Espaillat González (1900–1933)  Juan Tomás Tavares Julia
 Gustavo Tavares Espaillat
  Manuel Enrique Tavares Espaillat
  Amantina Rafaela Espaillat González (1903–2006)  Manuel Alejandro Grullón Rodríguez-Objío (1895–1985)
  Alejandro Enrique Grullón Espaillat (b. 1929)  Ana Dínorah Viñas Messina (1952–2001);  Melba Segura Castillo
 Manuel Alejandro Grullón Viñas (b. 1953)  Rosa “Cuchita” Hernández
  Manuel Alejandro Grullón Hernández  Stephanie Baud
 Virginia Grullón Viñas  José Ramón Prats
 Eduardo Grullón Viñas  Jhoanna Rodríguez
  Alexandra María Grullón Segura (b. 1998)
 Ulises Francisco Espaillat Julia (Santiago, 1879–1933)  Aracelis Carrón Mora 
 Ulises Augusto Espaillat Carrón  Margarita Mercedes Vega Espaillat
 José Ulises Espaillat Vega (1931–1947)
  Margarita Mercedes Espaillat Vega (1938–1960)
 María Matilde Espaillat Carrón  Mario Giusseppe Schiffino Gorra 
  Estela Mercedes Espaillat Carrón
 Pedro Ramón Espaillat Julia (Santiago, 1882–1965)  Eleonora Grullón Rodríguez-Objío (1900–1978)
 Alejandro Augusto Espaillat Grullón (Santiago, 1904–Santo Domingo, 1984)  Josefina Eugenia Cabral Bermúdez
  Pedro Ramón Espaillat Cabral (1943–1985)
  Alejandro Augusto Espaillat Cabral (1948–)
  Alejandro José Espaillat Imbert 
  Pedro José Espaillat Vélez
  Carlos José Espaillat Vélez
  Fineta Rosario Espaillat Cabral 
 María del Rosario Espaillat Grullón  José Manuel Elmúdesi Porcella 
  Leonor Rosario Elmúdesi Espaillat  Juan Francisco Bancalari Brugal
 Juan José Bancalari Elmúdesi 
  Manuel Andrés Bancalari Elmúdesi 
  Mariana Felicia Espaillat Grullón  Luis Crouch Bogaert
 Luis Arturo Crouch Espaillat
 Miguel Eduardo Crouch Espaillat
 Ramón Alejando Crouch Espaillat
  María del Rosario Crouch Espaillat
 María Enriqueta Espaillat Julia (Santiago, 1884–1915)  her cousin Juan Julio Julia Ricardo (Santiago, 1879–Moca, 1934)
  José Oscar Julia Espaillat (1914–1987)  Olga Marranzini Marra
 Carmen Virginia Julia Marranzini  (b. 1946)
  María Rosa Julia Marranzini (b. 1955)
 Eloísa Espaillat Julia (Santiago, 1885–1976)  José Cayetano Vega Llenas
 Gustavo Eduardo Vega Espaillat (1904–1989)
 Augusto Vega Espaillat  
  José Augusto Vega Imbert
  Margarita Mercedes Vega Espaillat  Ulises Augusto Espaillat Carrón
 José Ulises Espaillat Vega (1931–1947)
  Margarita Mercedes Espaillat Vega (1938–1960)
 María Mercedes Espaillat Julia (Santiago, 1886–1917)
 María Matilde Espaillat Julia (Santiago, 1889–1976)  Andrés Alejandro Pastoriza Valverde (1887–?)
 Andrés Alejandro Pastoriza Espaillat (1914–1994); never got married.
 Tomás Augusto “Jimmy” Pastoriza Espaillat (1919–2002)  Claudina Julia Tavares Grieser (1923–2011)
 María Matilde Pastoriza Tavares (b. 1946)  Roberto Bonnetti Guerra
 Andrés Gustavo Pastoriza Tavares (b. 1948)
  María Matilde Pastoriza Espaillat (b. 1923)  Héctor Rafael García-Godoy Cáceres (1921–1970)
 Ana Matilde García-Godoy Pastoriza (1946–1987)  Manuel Alvarez Reyes
  Guillermo García-Godoy Pastoriza (b. 1950)  Elisa Aleone Alfonseca Giner de los Ríos;  Jennie Burch
  Felicia Espaillat Julia (Santiago, 1891–1972)
 María Dolores “Lola” Espaillat Espaillat (Santiago, 1853–ibid., 1936)  José Joaquín Batlle Filbá (Mataró, Spain, 1844–Santiago, 1899)
 Jaime José Batlle Espaillat (1873–1923)  Tomasina de la Caridad Vega Llenas (Santiago, 1880–Santo Domingo, 1964)
 Jaime Tomás Batlle Vega 
 Rosa Amelia Batlle Vega 
 María Mercedes Batlle Vega 
 Felipe José Batlle Vega
 Nydia Amalia Batlle Vega
 María Cristina Batlle Vega  Miguel Ángel Delgado Sosa (Santo Domingo, 1894–1970)
 Tomasina Altagracia Delgado Batlle (b. 1929)  Manuel María Alfaro Ricart (m. 1952); Rafael Mencía Lister (m. 1961)
  María Cristina Brea Batlle  Alberto Bonetti Burgos
  Augusto Batlle Vega  Enma Ginebra de la Rocha
  Altagracia Mercedes Batlle Ginebra  Federico Antún Abud
  Federico Antún Batlle
 María Asunción Batlle Espaillat (Santiago, 1876–Santo Domingo, 1972)  José Nicolás Vega Llenas (Santiago, 1867–ibid., 1925)
 Carmen María Vega Batlle  Pedro Manuel Olavarrieta Pérez
 Mercedes Amalia Vega Batlle  José María Cabral Bermúdez
 José María Cabral Vega (b. 1933)  Graciela Genoveva Lluberes Henríquez
Amalia Josefina Gabriela Cabral Lluberes (b. 1963)
Claudia Cabral Lluberes (b. 1964)  Edmundo Batlle Bermúdez
 Ana Amelia Batlle Cabral
 Laura Emilia Batlle Cabral
 José María Cabral Lluberes (b. 1967)
 Petrica Cabral Vega (b. 1938)  José León Asensio (b. 1934)
 María Amalia León Cabral (b. 1960)  Marcos Augusto Jorge Elías
  Sarah Amalia Jorge León
 Lidia Josefina León Cabral (b. 1962)  Luis Domingo Viyella Caolo
  José Eduardo León Cabral (1963–1975); never got married.
 María Josefina Cabral Vega  Manuel Vicente Díez Méndez
  Manuel Vicente Díez Cabral (b. 1964)
  Marco Buenaventura Cabral Vega
 María Dolores Vega Batlle 
 Julio Francisco Vega Batlle  Teresa Boyrie de Moya
 Wenceslao Nicolás Vega Boyrie
 Bernardo Vega Boyrie
  Luis Eduardo “Eddy” Vega Boyrie
 Prima Aurora Vega Batlle 
 Carlos Manuel Vega Batlle 
 Virginia Vega Batlle 
 Jaime Rafael Vega Batlle (1906–1970)  Elsa López-Penha Alfau
  Jaime Enrique Vega López-Penha  Ángela Peynado Garrigosa
 Rosa María Vega Batlle 
  Francisco Nicolás Vega Batlle 
 Manuel Francisco Batlle Espaillat (Santiago, 1878–1946)  Clara Nadelia Viñas Malagón
 Carmen Rosa Batlle Viñas  Aquiles Bermúdez Ramos
 Clara Nadelia Batlle Viñas  Jacques Thomén Candelario
 Edmundo Enrique Batlle Viñas  his second-cousin once-removed Ana Idalia Bermúdez Espaillat (1924–1999)
  Edmundo Batlle Bermúdez  Claudia Cabral Lluberes (b. 1964)
Ana Amelia Batlle Cabral
Laura Emilia Batlle Cabral
 José Abelardo Batlle Viñas (1904-1995)  Lucía Victoria Brugal André (1908–1995)
  Mario Antonio Batlle Viñas (1908–2012)  Otilia Mercedes Bertha Franco Fondeur (1915-1995)
 María Dolores Batlle Espaillat (Santiago, 1879–ibidem, 1879); never got married.
 José Francisco Batlle Espaillat (Santiago, 1880–1980)
 Cosme Antonio Batlle Espaillat (Santiago, 1881–1914)
 Rafael Batlle Espaillat (Santiago, 1883–ibid. 1909)  Matilde Julia Ricardo
 
  Mercedes Dolores Batlle Julia
 Juan Francisco Batlle Espaillat (Santiago, 1885–ibidem, 1958)  his third-cousin Amelia Dolores Morell Espaillat
 Aída Mercedes Batlle Morell (1909–2011)  Rafael Filiberto Bonnelly Fondeur (1904–1979)
 Luisa Amelia Bonnelly Batlle  Rafael Hernández Mota
 Rafael Francisco Bonnelly Batlle  Lucía Ricart Pellerano (†);  Margarita Casals
 Juan Sully Bonnelly Batlle  Pura Álvarez 
  Aída Mercedes Bonnelly Batlle  Reynaldo Bisonó 
 Reinaldo Bisonó Bonnelly
 Cosme Rafael Batlle Morell 
 Daysi Antonia Batlle Morell 
 Oscar Rafael Batlle Morell 
 Roberto Augusto Batlle Morell 
 Víctor Manuel Batlle Morell  Lourdes Lidilia Jorge Blanco (Santiago, 1922–ibidem, 2001)
 Juan José Batlle Morell (Santiago, 1907–1975)  María Eva Álvarez Pereyra 
  Luis Tomás Batlle Morell (Santiago, 1917–La Ciénaga de Higüerito, 1942)
 Rosa Mercedes Batlle Espaillat (Santiago, 1887–1972)  Manuel Arturo Tavares Julia
 Julia Dolores Tavares Batlle  Domingo Octavio Bermúdez Ramos
  Rosa María Tavares Batlle (Santiago, 1911–ibid., 2000)  Marco Antonio Cabral Bermúdez
 Julia Amelia Cabral Tavares  Frank Joseph Thomén Lembcke
  Manuel José Cabral Tavares
 Augusto Batlle Espaillat (Santiago, 1888–ibidem, 1979)  Asunción Coralia Nicolás Rodríguez 
 María del Carmen Batlle Espaillat (Santiago, 1890–1971)  Salvador Augusto Cocco Pastoriza (1892–1995)
 Manuel Augusto Cocco Batlle  Gisela Guerrero Dujarric
 Manuel Augusto Cocco Guerrero
 Miguel Salvador Cocco Guerrero (Santiago, 1941–Santo Domingo, 2009)  Aura Minerva González Tabar
 Patricia Margarita Cocco Guerrero
  Pedro José Cocco Guerrero
  Carmen Aura Cocco Batlle  Federico Thomén Candelario
  Ana Mercedes Batlle Espaillat (Santiago, 1893–ibidem, 1981)  José Mauricio Álvarez Perelló
  Ana Antonia Álvarez Batlle  Jean Antonio Haché Zogbi
 Adela Espaillat Espaillat (Santiago, 1856–1946)
 Sofía Espaillat Espaillat (Santiago, 1857–1895)  Pílades Stéfani Viegani (Barga, Italy, 1854–Santiago, 1928)
 María Italia Stéfani Espaillat (1881–1882)
 María Filomena Stéfani Espaillat (Santiago, 1882–ibid., 1967)  Manuel Antonio Valverde Olivo
 Mercedes Octavia Valverde Stéfani 
 María Sofía Valverde Stéfani 
 Manuel Antonio Valverde Stéfani (1906–1976)  Caridad Rafaela Lara Viñas (Moca, 1908-1979, 1932)
 Manuel Antonio Valverde Lara Jr (Santiago, 1933)  Nilda Isabel Rivera Rivera (Jayuya, Puerto Rico, 1933)
 Marie Isabel Valverde Rivera (1964)
 Jose Manuel Valverde Rivera (1969)  Viviana Alexandra Aviles Garcia (1973)
 Jose Daniel Valverde (1994)
 Luis Antonio Valverde (2001)
 Fernando Emilio Valverde Lara (1935-2020)  Idalia Lopez Gonzalez (1935)
 Mary Jo Valverde Lopez (1958)
 Virginia Maria Valverde Lopez (1959)
 Fernando Emilio Valverde Lopez (1960)
 Emilie Anne Valverde Lopez (1962)
  Sebastián Emilio Valverde Stéfani (1911–1962)
 María Electa Stéfani Espaillat (Santiago, 1884–ibid., 1972)
 María Adela Stéfani Espaillat (Santiago, 1889–ibid., 1953)  Anibal Comolli Becchi 
  Juan Bautista Stéfani Espaillat (1893–1938)
  Rafael de Jesús Espaillat Espaillat (Santiago, 1863–1949)  María Encarnación Gutiérrez
 Rafael Armando Espaillat Gutiérrez (1886–1952)
 Juan de Jesús Espaillat Gutiérrez (1887–1979)
 Isabel Estelvina Espaillat Gutiérrez (1890–1914)

Notes

External links
 Historia República Dominicana 

1823 births
1878 deaths
People from Santiago de los Caballeros
People of the Dominican Restoration War
Presidents of the Dominican Republic
Vice presidents of the Dominican Republic
Dominican Republic people of Spanish descent
Dominican Republic people of Canarian descent
Dominican Republic people of French descent
Dominican Republic people of Italian descent
Dominican Republic independence activists
White Dominicans